Panchan may refer to:

 Panchan Rina, Japanese kickboxer
 Panchan, Nepal, village
 Panchen Lama, Tibetan title
 Banchan, Korean cuisine